Roger Simon, 2nd Baron Simon of Wythenshawe (16 October 1913 – 14 October 2002) was a British solicitor and left wing journalist and political activist. He was one of the founders of the Campaign for Nuclear Disarmament.

The elder son of Ernest, first Lord Simon and Shena, Lady Simon, he inherited the title on his father's death in 1960. Although he never renounced the title, he did not use it.

After Gresham's School, Holt, Norfolk, where he was a contemporary of James Klugmann, Benjamin Britten and Donald Maclean, Simon read economics at Gonville and Caius College, Cambridge. While there he was invited to join the Political Economy Club run by John Maynard Keynes. At one of the club's meetings, Piero Sraffa, a friend of Antonio Gramsci, advised him to read Karl Marx, and Simon later joined the Communist Party, as his brother Brian Simon had done earlier.  Simon was influenced in this decision by meeting Emile Burns on the boat to the Soviet Union in 1936 - a trip with his parents.

In 1935, he qualified as a solicitor, and from 1942 to 1945 he served in the Royal Signals. He went for officer training at Catterick, where he met the Marxist Arnold Kettle, later a close friend.

From 1945 to 1946, he taught law at Welbeck Abbey, where soldiers with three years' service could have a month's free education. At Welbeck he met Edmund Penning-Rowsell, another communist who became a lifelong friend and fellow wine enthusiast.

From 1946 to 1958, he worked for Ealing Borough Council as a solicitor. He married Daphne May in 1951 and they had two children.  He had a love of walking and often visited the Lake District.

In 1958 he joined the Labour Research Department, becoming secretary from 1965 to 1977 but continued doing work for the organisation until just before his death. He published many pamphlets and articles on economic issues. Within the Communist Party, where he sat on the Economic Committee, he strongly supported the "Eurocommunist" philosophy.  He was also on the board of Lawrence and Wishart and encouraged the publication of "Selections from the Prison Notebooks of Antonio Gramsci" in 1971.

His last ten years were devoted to red-green politics.

He was a member of the William Morris Society.

References
 Pat Devine, Obituary, The Guardian, 25 October 2002.

Publications
 Local Councils and the Citizen, Stevens & Sons (1948)
 The British State, Lawrence & Wishart (1958) (co-authored, under the pseudonyms James Harvey & Katherine Hood)
 Light on the City, LRD Publications (1962)
 An Introduction To Gramsci's Political Thought (1982)
 William Morris Now - Socialism by Design, Communist Party (1984)
 Introducing Marxism, Communist Party (1986)

1913 births
2002 deaths
People educated at Gresham's School
Alumni of Gonville and Caius College, Cambridge
Barons in the Peerage of the United Kingdom
British male journalists
Communist Party of Great Britain members
Labour Party (UK) hereditary peers
British Army personnel of World War II
Royal Corps of Signals officers
Simon of Wythenshawe